Sharon Delores Clarke  (born 12 August 1966) is an English actress and singer. She is a three-time Olivier award winner, and is best known to television audiences for her role as Lola Griffin in the medical drama Holby City, and as Grace O'Brien in Doctor Who. Clarke has also played lead roles in many West End musicals, and originated the roles of the Killer Queen in We Will Rock You and Oda Mae Brown in Ghost the Musical.

Throughout her stage career, Clarke has been nominated for several Laurence Olivier Awards. She won the 2014 Laurence Olivier Award for Best Actress in a Supporting Role for her role in James Baldwin's The Amen Corner. She won her second Olivier for Best Actress in a Musical for her role as Caroline Thibodeaux in the 2018 West End production of Caroline, or Change, a role she reprised on Broadway in 2021, earning her both Tony and Grammy Award nominations. In October 2020, she won her third Olivier for her role in the revival of Death of a Salesman at London's Young Vic.

Career

Television
Clarke is known for her role in the BBC medical drama Holby City, in which she played Lola Griffin, a doctor with ancestors from Ghana. She left the programme in 2008. Clarke reprised the role for one episode in 2019.

Other television roles include the character of Gran'Ma Flossie in the CBBC show The Crust. In 2008, Clarke sat alongside Russell Watson as a judge on the BBC talent show Last Choir Standing. Clarke's other TV credits include: Waking the Dead, Soldier Soldier, Broken Glass, Between the Lines, Children's Ward, Stop, Look & Listen – Mary Seacole, Past Caring, The Singing Detective, EastEnders, Boo! and Informer.

Clarke has also appeared as a guest on Ready Steady Cook, hosted by Ainsley Harriott, representing Holby City in 2008, winning with chef Garrey Dawson.

She has been a guest on The Paul O'Grady Show and sang the "O'Grady, O'Grady" song to celebrate the 500th show. She has also made appearances on Children in Need for the BBC, performing as Killer Queen with the cast of We Will Rock You and also singing with her Holby City co-stars.

On 10 August 2010, Clarke appeared in an episode of The Bill, "Death Knock" as brothel owner Denise Jones.

On 24 January 2011, she appeared in EastEnders, as Connor Stanley's mother Kendra. In May 2011, Clarke starred in the BBC drama The Shadow Line as Mrs. Dixon, appearing in episodes 2 and 3.

Clarke voices the character of Treetog in the CBeebies series Tree Fu Tom.

In October 2017, the BBC announced that Clarke had been cast as Grace O'Brien in the eleventh series of Doctor Who, appearing in the episodes "The Woman Who Fell To Earth", "Arachnids in the UK" and "It Takes You Away". She later made brief cameo appearances in the twelfth series episode "Can You Hear Me?", and in the 2021 festive special "Revolution of the Daleks".

In December 2017, Clarke made a guest appearance on Thunderbirds Are Go, providing the voice for Fire Chief Cass McCready in the Season 2 episode Inferno, which wasn't broadcast on ITV but was still shown on Amazon Video.

Theatre
Clarke's first professional role was in Southside, directed by Jude Kelly, at Battersea Arts Centre in 1984. This role allowed Clarke to be issued her Actor's Equity Card. 

She then went on to play Dolores Hope in the 1988 Talawa Theatre Company production of O Babylon! The Musical, the story of the Trench Town community's struggle for survival against the encroachment of Babylon, in the form of a new luxury hotel.

Clarke has also appeared in West End theatre. Her roles include General Cartwright in Guys and Dolls (1996), Joanne Jefferson in Rent at the Shaftesbury Theatre (1998), and Miss Sherman in Fame (1999). She played Rafiki in The Lion King from 2000 to 2002 at the Lyceum Theatre and in 2004 played the character of Matron Mama Morton in Chicago.

In 2000, Clarke appeared in Flymonkey's production of The Wiz. In that production, she played the role of Glinda at the Hackney Empire.

She originated the role of Killer Queen in the Ben Elton/Queen jukebox musical We Will Rock You at the Dominion Theatre, alongside Alexander Hanson as Commander Khashoggi, for which she was nominated for the Laurence Olivier Award for Best Performance in a Supporting Role in a Musical.

In 2008, Clarke made her pantomime début in the Hackney Empire's Mother Goose. She starred in Once on This Island in Birmingham at the Birmingham Repertory Theatre. She was also set to star in The Vagina Monologues and Once on This Island at the Hackney Empire in 2009. She finished starring in the massively successful hit musical Hairspray when it closed on 28 March 2010 at the Shaftesbury Theatre. She played the role of Motormouth Maybelle, alongside Phill Jupitus and Brian Conley as Edna Turnblad.

Clarke was Davina the Diva Harp in Jack and the Beanstalk and Carmina the Camel in Aladdin, both at the Hackney Empire. In July 2010, she appeared in a one-off performance at the Hackney Empire called Sounds Like Hackney, alongside Clive Rowe.

Clarke made an appearance at Music on the Farm, held at Battlers Green Farm in aid of charity, singing hits from musicals that she has starred in.

In October 2010, the Apollo Victoria Theatre, home to the musical Wicked, celebrated its 80th anniversary and Clarke was a guest performer alongside other stars such as Wayne Sleep.

2011 saw Clarke take the role of Oda Mae Brown in a musical adaptation of the film Ghost. Beginning previews in March at the Manchester Opera House, the show transferred in June 2011 to the West End at the Piccadilly Theatre, replacing Grease. Clarke was nominated in 2012 for the Laurence Olivier Award for Best Performance in a Supporting Role in a Musical, losing out on the award to Nigel Harman for his role in Shrek the Musical.

In October 2011, she appeared in a concert of the new musical Soho Cinders at the Queen's Theatre, London. Clarke has also worked as Musical Director on Meridan.

Since finishing in Ghost The Musical upon its closure in 2012, Clarke has appeared in her own one-woman cabaret at the St James Theatre.

She appeared in James Baldwin's The Amen Corner at the Royal National Theatre, for which she won Best Supporting Actress at the 2014 Olivier Awards.

In the summer of 2014, she played the supporting role of Mariah in the Regent's Park Open Air Theatre production of Porgy and Bess.

In March 2015, Clarke played the Nurse in Romeo and Juliet at the Rose Theatre, Kingston.

In February 2016, she received critical acclaim for her role in a revival of August Wilson's Ma Rainey's Black Bottom at the Lyttelton Theatre (for example: "Sharon D Clarke is terrific as Ma Rainey, regally imperious" – The Telegraph; "Her golden delivery of the title song is a high point" – The Observer; "Sharon D Clarke offers a wonderfully obstreperous performance as the eponymous blues star" – Time Out; "the powerhouse delivery of Sharon D Clarke in the central role of Ma Rainey is exhilarating" – The Stage).

In 2017, she played the role of Sonya in Cy Coleman's musical The Life at Southwark Playhouse and Caroline Thibodeaux in Caroline, or Change at the Chichester Festival Theatre. Clarke reprised her role in Caroline, or Change when the production transferred to the Playhouse Theatre in the West End in 2018. At the 2019 Laurence Olivier Awards, Clarke won the Laurence Olivier Award for Best Actress in a Musical for this role. The production transferred to Roundabout Theatre Company's Studio 54 on Broadway in October 2021, having been postponed for over a year due to the COVID-19 pandemic. Clark reprised her role, making her Broadway debut and was well received by critics. The limited run ended on January 9, 2022.

In 2019, she played the role of Linda Loman in Arthur Miller’s play Death of a Salesman at the Young Vic, due to transfer to the West End in October 2019. In July 2019 she played the role of The Lady in Sheldon Epps’s Blues In The Night at the Kiln Theatre, London.

Music
Clarke achieved chart success with the FPI Project's remake of Going Back to My Roots and in Nomad with the singles "(I Wanna Give You) Devotion" and "Just a Groove", the latter of which sold more than two million singles worldwide.

Clarke was also part of the female vocal group Six Chix, formed for the Eurovision Song Contest 2000. They came second in the UK selection with the song "Only the Women Know". They were beaten by Nicki French singing "Don't Play That Song Again", which went on to Stockholm to finish 16th.

As well as appearing on the original cast recordings for Once on This Island, Stepping Out, We Will Rock You and Ghost The Musical, Clarke recorded the title song on Terry Pratchett's Only You Can Save Mankind album alongside other West End stars, including Kerry Ellis, Ricardo Afonso and Daniel Boys.

Personal life
Clarke is married to writer and director Susie McKenna. They wed on the Hackney Empire stage.

Clarke was appointed Member of the Order of the British Empire (MBE) in the 2017 New Year Honours for services to drama.

Filmography

Film

Television

Video games

Awards and nominations 
Tony Award

Laurence Olivier Awards

Grammy Awards

Drama Desk Awards

Outer Critics Circle Awards

Other awards

References

External links
 

Living people
1966 births
20th-century English actresses
21st-century English actresses
Actresses from London
Black British actresses
20th-century Black British women singers
English musical theatre actresses
English people of Ghanaian descent
English stage actresses
English television actresses
English video game actresses
English voice actresses
English lesbian actresses
LGBT Black British people
20th-century English LGBT people
21st-century English LGBT people
Members of the Order of the British Empire
People from Enfield, London